Antonio de Miguel (born 25 June 1899, date of death unknown) was an Argentine footballer. He played in 11 matches for the Argentina national football team from 1920 to 1926. He was also part of Argentina's squad for the 1920 South American Championship.

References

External links
 
 

1899 births
Year of death missing
Argentine footballers
Argentina international footballers
Place of birth missing
Association football forwards
Rosario Central footballers
Newell's Old Boys footballers
Tiro Federal footballers